Blackwaterfoot is a village on the Isle of Arran in the Firth of Clyde, Scotland. The village is within the parish of Kilmory. It is located in the Shiskine valley in the south-west of the island.  It is one of the smaller villages of Arran and home to one of Europe's two 12-hole golf courses. A short walk from Blackwaterfoot is Drumadoon Point, home to the largest Iron Age fort on Arran. Further North is the King's Cave, reputed to be a hiding place of Robert the Bruce.

References

External links

Canmore - Arran, Blackwaterfoot site record
Canmore - Arran, Blackwaterfoot site record

Villages in the Isle of Arran